The Oldman River Dam is a dam on the Oldman River in southwestern Alberta, Canada. The dam is north of Pincher Creek in the Municipal District of Pincher Creek No. 9.

Controversy
The Oldman River Dam was completed in 1991. The project had been opposed by some members of the Piikani Nation, led by Milton Born With A Tooth, who argued that the Piikani owned the rights to the water in the river and that the dam would result in the flooding of sacred Piikani land, (their burial ground). In 1990, Born With A Tooth attempted to use an excavator to divert the river away from the Lethbridge Northern Irrigation District canal intake. When the Royal Canadian Mounted Police arrived, Born With A Tooth fired his rifle twice. Ultimately, he was convicted of assault and several other offences and spent four and a half years in prison.

The dam was the subject of a number of legal challenges in the 1980s and 1990s.

Power production and recreation area
Since 2003, ATCO has operated the Oldman River Hydroelectric Plant at the dam. The plant is capable of producing 32 megawatts of electrical power; the average annual generation is approximately 114 gigawatt-hours per year. The plant is 25 percent owned by the Piikani Nation. The Oldman River in southwestern Alberta provides 30 per cent of the water flow for the
South Saskatchewan River Basin.

The reservoir created by the dam and the surrounding area constitutes the Oldman Dam Provincial Recreation Area.

References
James Daschuk and Gregory P. Marchildon, "Historical Chronology of the Oldman River Dam Conflict", parc.ca, accessed 7 June 2016.
David B. Chalcroft (1988), "The Engineering Background to the Oldman River Dam and Reservoir", Canadian Water Resources Journal 13:3, 6–14
R. C. de Loe (1999), "Dam the news: Newspapers and the Oldman River Dam project in Alberta", Journal of Environmental Management 55:219–37.

External links
"Oldman River Dam", uleth.ca, accessed 7 June 2016.
"Oldman Dam Provincial Recreation Area", albertaparks.ca, accessed 7 June 2016.
"Oldman River Hydroelectric Plant", atcopower.com, accessed 7 June 2016.

Dams in Alberta
Dam controversies
Municipal District of Pincher Creek No. 9
Dams completed in 1991
1991 establishments in Alberta